Live Wire is a 1992 American action film directed by Christian Duguay, written by Bart Baker, and starring Pierce Brosnan, Ron Silver, Ben Cross, and Lisa Eilbacher.

The plot revolves around a rash of seemingly inexplicable, explosive spontaneous human combustions and Danny O'Neill (Brosnan), a bomb disposal expert that gets involved and will eventually have to solve the case.

Plot
When a Senator is killed in an explosion, the FBI investigates. The agent in charge is bomb expert Danny O'Neill, who is separated from his wife Terry (due to the accidental drowning of their only child in their pool) and behaving very erratically. Initially the investigation does not reveal the kind of explosive used or even what was used to detonate it. Eventually it is learned that terrorists led by Mikhail Rashid have developed an "invisible" liquid explosive which is activated within the human body (by stomach acid). It also does not help that they have to report to Senator Traveres, the man whom Terry is having an affair with and whom Danny also assaulted.

Later, another senator is killed while riding in a limousine; the limo being driven by one of Rashid's henchmen. The henchman is subsequently struck by a moving car, taken into custody and brought into court, and since he is now considered a risk by Rashid, the judge in the case is slipped the liquid and she spontaneously explodes; the witness is subsequently killed, though O'Neill discovers the cause of the explosions - the chemically enhanced water in the judge's pitcher.
 
It becomes obvious that the next target is Senator Traveres, so O'Neill, concerned that Terry may become collateral damage, trails his every move. At a fundraiser, Traveres is targeted by Rashid's main henchman, Al-red, who is disguised as a clown. Al-red tries to detonate a fountain filled with the explosive liquid, but O'Neill tackles him, leading to Al-red accidentally swallowing some of the liquid himself. O'Neill subdues Al-red and gets him away from party in a wheelchair just before he explodes. In the aftermath, O'Neill and Terry finally reconcile.

Aware that Traveres is still not safe, O'Neill infiltrates the senator's heavily guarded mansion, at a very convenient time as it is being overrun by the terrorists. O'Neill concocts a cornucopia of home-made weapons, even building bombs using fertilizer found in the kitchen cabinet. All the terrorists are killed except for Rashid, who holds Terry hostage in front of him and Traveres.

Rashid swallows some of the liquid, sealing his fate but intending to bring them all down with him. O'Neill manages to free Terry and send her to safe ground. He and Traveres however are cornered and are thus subsequently forced to jump from the third floor due to Rashid's explosion. Traveres lands on a wrought-iron fence which impales and kills him, though O'Neill survives. A year later, he has a second child with Terry.

Cast
Pierce Brosnan as Danny O'Neill
Ron Silver as Senator Frank Traveres
Ben Cross as Mikhail Rashid
Lisa Eilbacher as Terry O'Neill
Tony Plana as Al-red
Al Waxman as James Garvey
Brent Jennings as Shane Rogers
Philip Baker Hall as Senator Thyme
Norman Burton as Senator Victor
Lauren Holly as Suzie Bryant - Channel 7 newsreporter (uncredited)

Release and Reception
The film, which was being prepped as a summer blockbuster at a time when distributor New Line was trying to diversify its movies, was instead released on cable television before receiving a home media release. In 2003, the film was cited in DC Goes to the Movies: A Unique Guide to the Reel Washington as the "best bad movie" set in Washington, D.C.

External links

References

1992 films
1992 drama films
1990s action drama films
American action drama films
1990s English-language films
Films about bomb disposal
Films about the Federal Bureau of Investigation
Films about terrorism in the United States
Films directed by Christian Duguay (director)
Films produced by Suzanne Todd
Films scored by Craig Safan
Films set in Washington, D.C.
Films shot in Washington, D.C.
New Line Cinema films
1990s American films